The 2017 Thailand Open Grand Prix Gold will be the seventh grand prix's badminton tournament of the 2017 BWF Grand Prix Gold and Grand Prix. The tournament will be held at Nimibutr Stadium in Bangkok in Thailand 30 May – 4 June 2017 and had a total purse of $120,000.

Men's singles

Seeds

 Tanongsak Saensomboonsuk (quarterfinals)
 Marc Zwiebler (third round)
 B. Sai Praneeth (champion)
 Jonatan Christie (final)
 Brice Leverdez (quarterfinals)
 Ihsan Maulana Mustofa (withdrew)
 Zulfadli Zulkiffli (second round)
 Wei Nan (second round)
 Iskandar Zulkarnain Zainuddin (third round)
 Sony Dwi Kuncoro (first round)
 Pablo Abián (first round)
 Sourabh Verma (third round)
 Chong Wei Feng (third round)
 Emil Holst (first round)
 Khosit Phetpradab (third round)
 Suppanyu Avihingsanon (third round)

Finals

Top half

Section 1

Section 2

Section 3

Section 4

Bottom half

Section 5

Section 6

Section 7

Section 8

Women's singles

Seeds

 Ratchanok Intanon (champion)
 Saina Nehwal (semifinals)
 Beiwen Zhang (semifinals)
 Busanan Ongbamrungphan (final)
 Nitchaon Jindapol (quarterfinals)
 Pornpawee Chochuwong (quarterfinals)
 Michelle Li (first round)
 Fabienne Deprez (first round)

Finals

Top half

Section 1

Section 2

Bottom half

Section 3

Section 4

Men's doubles

Seeds

 Kim Astrup / Anders Skaarup Rasmussen (second round)
 Bodin Isara / Nipitphon Phuangphuapet (second round)
 Fajar Alfian / Muhammad Rian Ardianto (quarterfinals)
 Marcus Ellis / Chris Langridge (semifinals)
 Berry Angriawan / Hardianto (champion)
 Kittinupong Kedren / Dechapol Puavaranukroh (second round)
 Jones Ralfy Jansen / Josche Zurwonne (quarterfinals)
 Danny Bawa Chrisnanta / Hendra Wijaya (first round)

Finals

Top half

Section 1

Section 2

Bottom half

Section 3

Section 4

Women's doubles

Seeds

 Puttita Supajirakul / Sapsiree Taerattanachai (withdrew)
 Jongkolphan Kititharakul / Rawinda Prajongjai (quarterfinals)
 Lim Yin Loo / Yap Cheng Wen (second round)
 Setyana Mapasa / Gronya Somerville (quarterfinals)
 Greysia Polii / Apriyani Rahayu (champion)
 Du Yue / Xu Ya (semifinals)
 Keshya Nurvita Hanadia / Devi Tika Permatasari (quarterfinals)
 Meghana Jakkampudi / Poorvisha S Ram (first round)

Finals

Top half

Section 1

Section 2

Bottom half

Section 3

Section 4

Mixed doubles

Seeds

 Dechapol Puavaranukroh / Sapsiree Taerattanachai (semifinals)
 Terry Hee Yong Kai / Tan Wei Han (semifinals)
 Bodin Isara / Savitree Amitrapai (second round)
 Nipitphon Phuangphuapet / Jongkolphan Kititharakul (second round)
 Goh Soon Huat / Shevon Jemie Lai (final)
 Nico Ruponen / Amanda Hogstrom (first round)
 Mark Lamsfuss / Isabel Herttrich (quarterfinals)
 Ronald Alexander / Annisa Saufika (quarterfinals)

Finals

Top half

Section 1

Section 2

Bottom half

Section 3

Section 4

References

External links 
 Tournament Link

Thailand Open
Thailand Open Grand Prix Gold
Badminton, Grand Prix Gold, Thailand Open
Badminton, Grand Prix Gold, Thailand Open
Thailand Open (badminton)
Badminton, Grand Prix Gold, Thailand Open
Badminton, Grand Prix Gold, Thailand Open